The 1987 NBA Finals was the championship round of the National Basketball Association (NBA)'s 1986–87 season, and the culmination of the season's playoffs. The Western Conference champion Los Angeles Lakers defeated the Eastern Conference and defending NBA champion Boston Celtics 4 games to 2. The key moment of the series was Magic Johnson's Junior sky hook in Game 4. This was the tenth time that the Celtics and Lakers met in the NBA Finals (more than any other Finals matchup). It would be the Celtics' last Finals appearance until the two teams met in 2008.

This was the first NBA Championship Series conducted entirely in June. The last time there were no NBA Championship Series games in May was in the 1970–1971 season, when the finals (a four-game sweep that year) ended on April 30. It is also the first NBA Finals series to be conducted on a Sunday-Tuesday-Thursday rotation, which was in use until 1990 and revived since the 2004 NBA Finals; in between the NBA Finals were conducted on a Sunday-Wednesday-Friday rotation.

Background

Boston Celtics

Thanks to the 1984 trade of Gerald Henderson and the subsequent fall of the Seattle SuperSonics, at the end of 1985–86 the Celtics were not only the best team in the NBA but also owned the second pick in the 1986 NBA Draft. They chose Len Bias with the pick and had high hopes that the presence of the young Maryland Terrapins star would ensure that the franchise would remain a powerhouse after Bird, McHale, and Parish retired. Unfortunately, Bias died 48 hours after being drafted, after using cocaine at a party and overdosing.

The Celtics finished the regular season with a 59–23 record, best in the Eastern Conference. Despite retaining the core of the team that won the championship a year earlier, Boston endured numerous injuries to its roster. Their bench, an asset of the previous year's team, was decimated by injuries to Scott Wedman and Bill Walton. With limited options, head coach K. C. Jones was forced to give his starting five of Larry Bird, Kevin McHale, Robert Parish, Dennis Johnson and Danny Ainge extended minutes, but the lengthy playing time took its toll on the players' health, and by the start of the playoffs, the Celtics were a roster full of walking wounded.

After sweeping the Chicago Bulls in the first round, the Celtics were pushed to a Game 7 in the next two rounds by the Milwaukee Bucks and the Detroit Pistons, only to advance each time. Still, the Celtics' health became a question mark as they entered the Finals.

Los Angeles Lakers

The Lakers finished the regular season with a league-best 65–17 record. Head coach Pat Riley made a strategical move, shifting the offensive focus to Magic Johnson. The Lakers acquired center Mychal Thompson via trade midway through the season. Both moves helped alleviate the load off of the aging Kareem Abdul-Jabbar, who turned 40 during the playoffs. A. C. Green supplanted Kurt Rambis in the starting lineup.

During the Lakers' path to the Finals they swept the Denver Nuggets in the first round, defeated the Golden State Warriors in five games during the second round, and swept the Seattle SuperSonics in the conference finals.

This 1987 Lakers team is widely considered both Magic Johnson’s best team, and one of the greatest teams in NBA history. There are many reasons for this besides Magic Johnson being league MVP this year instead of Larry Bird: Kareem was still in late prime condition, the Lakers had many scoring options, they had an excellent defense which included defensive player of the year and Michael Cooper, and Michael Thompson’s elite post defense Meant they had another body to throw at the lakes of McHale and Parish of the Celtics.

Road to the Finals

Regular season series
The Los Angeles Lakers won both games in the regular season series:

Series summary

Game 1

The Lakers were coming off a four-game sweep of the Seattle SuperSonics, while the Celtics were coming off a grueling seven-game win over the Detroit Pistons. Magic Johnson led a 126–113 victory with 29 points, 13 assists, eight rebounds and no turnovers. James Worthy, on the receiving end of many of Johnson's passes, had 33 points and nine rebounds. The Lakers ran 35 fast breaks in the first two quarters and led by 15 at intermission.

Game 2

The Celtics plan for Game 2 was to concentrate on stopping Magic Johnson. Danny Ainge, at 6'5", could not deal with the 6'9" Magic. In this game, Michael Cooper emerged as a great 3 point shooter.  He hit six 3 pointers, a playoff record.  Kareem Abdul-Jabbar added 23 points on 10 of 14 shots, while Magic posted 20 assists and 22 points.  It all added up to a 141–122 rout, Boston's sixth straight road loss in the playoffs.

Game 3

The Celtics recovered from their two knockout blows in Games 1 and 2 with a counterpunch of their own. A little-used backup center, Greg Kite, provided the spark. Kite, entering the game late in the first quarter when Robert Parish encountered foul trouble, played 20 minutes, and while he failed to score, he grabbed nine rebounds, blocked a Magic Johnson layup, and did solid body work on Kareem Abdul-Jabbar. The defensive minutes Kite gave Boston from the bench were just enough, as Larry Bird scored 30 points and Dennis Johnson hit 11 of 22 attempts from the field to finish with 26 points. The resurgent Celtics shot 17 of 21 from the floor in the second quarter.

Kevin McHale Celtics' forward bounced back in Boston with 21 points and 10 rebounds while letting the air out of James Worthy's game, limiting the Lakers' forward to only 13 points and three rebounds. Magic led the Lakers with 32 points in the 109–103 loss.

Game 4

After their Game 3 win, Larry Bird said, "This (Game 3) was the most important game of the series for us. If we lost, it might've been tough to get up for Game 4. Now it's going to be easy."

The Celtics took it right to the Lakers, controlling the boards and taking a 55–47 lead into halftime. The Celtics had a balanced scoring attack with Kevin McHale, Robert Parish, Danny Ainge, and Dennis Johnson all scoring in double figures. In the 3rd quarter, Bird finally got hot by scoring 12 in the quarter and helping the Celtics lead by as many as 16 points. But Los Angeles fought back to cut the Celtics lead to 85-78 going into the 4th.

In the 4th quarter the Lakers continued fighting back until they managed to tie the game at 95–95 on a Kareem Abdul-Jabbar skyhook with 5:30 remaining. The Celtics responded on both ends of the court by going on an 8–0 run, helped by good defense which led to 2 fast-break lay-ups to take a 103–96 lead with 2 minutes left. Then the Lakers called time out. On the Celtics' next possession, Robert Parish lost the ball to Michael Cooper. Cooper passed the ball ahead to Magic Johnson, who started a break. Cooper spotted up in 3-point territory, while Magic drove, forcing Cooper's defender to help out. Magic then kicked the ball out to a now wide open Cooper who drilled the three to cut the lead to 103–100.

On the Celtics next possession, Larry Bird forced a pass to Kevin McHale in the post, which instead sailed out of bounds, giving possession right back to the Lakers. James Worthy then hit a tough fade-away over Kevin McHale and Robert Parish in the lane to cut the deficit to one. On the very next possession, Bird missed a step-back jumper over the outstretched frame of Kareem Abdul-Jabbar, and the Lakers got the ball back with just under 45 seconds remaining. The Lakers called a timeout to set up a pick for Kareem Abdul-Jabbar.  The pass was there for an alley-oop dunk, and the Lakers took a 104–103 lead, their first lead since early in the 1st quarter. The Celtics called timeout with 29 seconds left in the game.

Out of the timeout Bird threw the ball inbounds and was immediately face-guarded by James Worthy. In fact, Worthy had a fist-full of Bird's jersey to make sure Bird would not score. With Worthy's defense, the Celtics could not get their best player the ball and instead went through the motions of their offense until Danny Ainge got open. That forced Worthy to let go of Bird and help out on Ainge. Bird immediately got himself open by going to the 3-point line right in front of the Lakers' bench. Ainge found Bird wide open and Bird hit the three point bomb with 12 seconds left, to put Boston up 106-104 and sent the Boston Garden crowd into a frenzy.

On the next possession, Abdul-Jabbar was fouled and went to the line, where he made the first and missed the second. The officials ruled that McHale fumbled the ball out of bounds with seven seconds left.

What followed was another play for the ages. Magic set a pick on Kevin McHale, which almost opened up a lay-up for Worthy, but Dennis Johnson was able to switch over in time on help defend. However, that left McHale scrambling to guard Magic who just got open and received the inbounds pass near the left sideline. Twenty feet from the basket, Magic had the advantage on the post-defender McHale, who was also playing through a bad ankle injury.  Magic dribbled, hesitated to get McHale off-balance, then drove into the paint. Magic then lofted a hook shot, which just cleared the fingertips of both McHale and Parish, and swished through the net giving the Lakers a 107–106 lead with only 2 seconds left.

The Celtics still had one last shot: Dennis inbounded the ball to Bird, who had broken to the corner. Larry, to his surprise, found himself wide open behind the 3-point line right in front of the Lakers' bench. Bird caught the inbounds pass from Johnson, turned, and put up a fall-away jumper as time expired. The shot barely missed as the Boston crowd let out a collective groan and the Lakers' bench danced off the court to celebrate the victory.  The win gave the Lakers a commanding 3–1 series lead.

Game 5

The Celtics had to win Game 5 in the Garden, and would control most of the game. Danny Ainge set the tone by nailing 5 of 6 from 3-point range to give Boston early control, including a halfcourt heave at the buzzer before halftime.

Magic countered for Los Angeles with 29 points, 12 assists, eight rebounds, and four steals, but he received little help. Before the game Bird had told his teammates, "If they want to celebrate, let's not let them do it on the parquet." The Celtics had incentive enough. They got their second win, 123–108, and the series jetted back across the continent.

Game 6

Kareem Abdul-Jabbar arrived for Game 6 with a shaved head and a determination to close out this series. For a while, though, it appeared like the Celtics would steal it. Magic Johnson had only four points at the half and Dennis Johnson poured in 18 for the Celtics on his way to a game-high 33 as Boston led 56–51 at intermission.

The Lakers scored the first two baskets of the second half to cut it to 56–55. On the Celtics' ensuing possession, James Worthy deflected a pass and gave chase. Worthy went to the floor, batted the ball inbounds to a breaking Magic Johnson, and Magic slammed home a breakaway dunk. This gave the Lakers their first lead of the game 57–56, since early in the first quarter, and they never trailed again. The Lakers outscored the Celtics 30–12 in the third quarter for an 18-point turnaround, mostly on fast breaks. The score at the end of three quarters was 81–68, Lakers. The Celtics only scored 12 points in the third quarter, one more than the record for the lowest scoring quarter in playoff history.

Worthy would finish with 22 points, and Mychal Thompson had 16 points and 10 rebounds off the bench, but the play of the Lakers' two superstars, Magic and Kareem, would be the dagger that finished off the Celtics. Magic recovered from his cold first half to post 16 points, 19 assists, and eight rebounds, and Kareem would pump in a team-high 32 points.

"Magic is a great, great basketball player," Bird stated flatly, settling the issue for the moment. "The best I've ever seen."

Indeed, Magic would gain the NBA Finals MVP award and his fourth championship ring.

For the Lakers, this would be their last NBA Finals series triumph over the Celtics until 2010.

Team rosters

Los Angeles Lakers

Boston Celtics

Player statistics

Los Angeles Lakers

|-
| align="left" |  || 6 || 6 || 33.8 || .510 || .000 || .667 || 7.3 || 0.8 || 0.5 || 2.5 || 21.7 
|-
| align="left" |  || 4 || 0 || 2.5 || .167 || .000 || .500 || 0.8 || 0.3 || 0.3 || 0.0 || 1.3 
|-
| align="left" |  || 6 || 0 || 29.8 || .540 || .609 || 1.000 || 2.3 || 4.7 || 1.7 || 0.3 || 12.0 
|-
| align="left" |  || 6 || 6 || 24.0 || .500 || .000 || .700 || 5.2 || 0.2 || 0.3 || 0.3 || 7.8 
|-! style="background:#FDE910;"
| align="left" |  || 6 || 6 || 39.3 || .541 || .500 || .960 || 8.0 || 13.0 || 2.3 || 0.3 || 26.2 
|-
| align="left" |  || 4 || 0 || 3.3 || .333 || .000 || .500 || 0.3 || 0.5 || 0.0 || 0.0 || 1.3 
|-
| align="left" |  || 6 || 0 || 9.3 || .429 || .000 || .833 || 2.5 || 0.5 || 0.0 || 0.0 || 1.8 
|-
| align="left" |  || 6 || 6 || 30.2 || .484 || .083 || .909 || 3.0 || 2.3 || 0.5 || 0.2 || 11.8 
|-
| align="left" |  || 4 || 0 || 2.3 || .333 || .000 || .000 || 1.3 || 0.0 || 0.0 || 0.3 || 0.5 
|-
| align="left" |  || 6 || 0 || 28.5 || .561 || .000 || .778 || 5.2 || 0.7 || 0.8 || 1.2 || 11.2 
|-
| align="left" |  || 6 || 6 || 39.7 || .523 || .000 || .526 || 5.3 || 4.0 || 1.7 || 0.8 || 20.7 

Boston Celtics

|-
| align="left" |  || 6 || 6 || 39.0 || .500 || .429 || 1.000 || 3.0 || 5.0 || 1.2 || 0.3 || 12.5 
|-
| align="left" |  || 6 || 6 || 42.3 || .445 || .500 || .921 || 10.0 || 5.5 || 1.2 || 1.2 || 24.2 
|-
| align="left" |  || 6 || 0 || 8.3 || .625 || .000 || 1.000 || 1.3 || 0.7 || 0.2 || 0.2 || 4.5 
|-
| align="left" |  || 4 || 0 || 3.8 || .444 || .000 || .500 || 0.8 || 0.0 || 0.0 || 0.0 || 2.5 
|-
| align="left" |  || 6 || 6 || 40.7 || .481 || .125 || .885 || 4.3 || 9.3 || 0.5 || 0.5 || 21.0 
|-
| align="left" |  || 6 || 0 || 12.7 || .222 || .000 || .500 || 3.0 || 0.8 || 0.3 || 0.8 || 0.8 
|-
| align="left" |  || 6 || 6 || 38.5 || .585 || .000 || .818 || 9.0 || 2.0 || 0.2 || 1.0 || 20.5 
|-
| align="left" |  || 6 || 6 || 30.5 || .592 || .000 || .593 || 6.5 || 1.2 || 0.8 || 1.2 || 16.7 
|-
| align="left" |  || 5 || 0 || 8.0 || .727 || .000 || .545 || 1.8 || 0.6 || 0.2 || 0.0 || 4.4 
|-
| align="left" |  || 6 || 0 || 9.3 || .267 || .000 || .000 || 0.7 || 1.8 || 0.3 || 0.0 || 1.3 
|-
| align="left" |  || 4 || 0 || 8.3 || .500 || .000 || .700 || 1.0 || 1.3 || 0.3 || 0.3 || 4.8 
|-
| align="left" |  || 5 || 0 || 4.8 || .600 || .000 || .000 || 1.0 || 0.2 || 0.0 || 0.2 || 1.2

Television coverage
The Boston Celtics season documentary Home of the Brave, narrated by David Perry, recaps Boston's 1987 season while the Los Angeles Lakers documentary Drive for Five, narrated by legendary Lakers announcer Chick Hearn, recaps the Lakers' magnificent 1987 season in route to a fourth title of the 1980s.

CBS' James Brown filled in for Pat O'Brien when he attended the birth of his son. Brown was on for Games 3 and 4. Both Brown and O'Brien reported on the Lakers' sideline. While Lesley Visser was on for all the games as sideline reporter for CBS as she reported on the Celtics' sideline.

Dick Stockton and Tom Heinsohn worked play-by-play and color commentary respectively. It was the fourth consecutive and last Finals series to pair Stockton and Heinsohn together; Heinsohn was demoted in favor of Billy Cunningham following the series. At the time, Stockton and Heinsohn had worked the most number of NBA Finals series together. ESPN/ABC's Mike Breen, Mark Jackson and Jeff Van Gundy later broke the record for the most complete NBA Finals series called by a single television play-by-play/color commentary team following the 2011 NBA Finals.

Aftermath 
The 1987 Finals would be the Celtics' last until 2008, but would be the last for the 'Big Three' of Larry Bird, Kevin McHale and Robert Parish. In K.C. Jones' final season as Celtics' coach they still won the Atlantic Division title by winning 57 games, but the Celtics fell in six games to the Detroit Pistons, in the rematch of their Eastern Conference Finals showdown in 1988. The Celtics would not reach that far again for the next 14 years.

Following their championship win, Lakers coach Pat Riley guaranteed a repeat championship during the team's championship parade a few days after winning the NBA Finals. The 1987-88 NBA season, despite winning three games less than the previous year, was still a success for the Lakers. However their playoff run would not be as smooth as expected. With the exception of a three-game first round sweep of the San Antonio Spurs, the Lakers were pushed to a Game 7 by the Utah Jazz, Dallas Mavericks, and Detroit Pistons before claiming the first repeat championship since the Celtics of 1969.

Prior to 2008, the Celtics and Lakers came close to renewing their rivalry in the 2002 NBA Finals. But while the Lakers defeated the Sacramento Kings 4–3, the Celtics lost to the New Jersey Nets 4–2 in their respective conference finals.

See also
1987 NBA Playoffs

References

External links

NBA History

National Basketball Association Finals
Finals
NBA
NBA
20th century in Los Angeles County, California
NBA Finals
NBA Finals
Basketball competitions in Boston
Basketball competitions in Inglewood, California
NBA Finals
NBA Finals